This is a list of novelists living in Australia or publishing significantly while living there.

A

B

C

D

E

F

G

H

I

J

K

L

M

N

O

P

Q

R

S

T

U

V

W

Y

Z

See also
Australian literature
List of novelists by nationality

 
Australian
Lists of Australian writers
Australian literature-related lists